Ludwig Pollak (14 September 1868, Prague – circa October 23, 1943, Auschwitz concentration camp) was an Austro-Czech classical archaeologist, antiquities dealer, and director of the Museo Barracco di Scultura Antica in Rome.

Biography
He is perhaps best known for discovering in 1906 the missing right arm of Laocoön in the famous ancient Roman sculpture Laocoön and His Sons.
The rest of the statue had been discovered in 1506, with the arm as well as several other pieces, including the arms of the sons and parts of the snake, missing. The Renaissance sculptor Michelangelo had correctly suggested that the missing right arms were originally bent back over the shoulder; however, most others disagreed, opting for a reconstructed arm in an heroic extended fashion. This incorrectly reconstructed arm was added to the statue.

In 1906, Pollak discovered a fragment of a marble arm in a builder‘s yard in Rome, close to the findspot of the rest of the statue. Noting a stylistic similarity to the Laocoön group he presented it to the Vatican Museums: it remained in their storerooms for half a century. In 1957 (after Pollak's murder at Auschwitz) the museum decided that this arm—bent, as Michelangelo had suggested—had originally belonged to this Laocoön, and replaced it. According to Paolo Liverani: "Remarkably, despite the lack of a critical section, the join between the torso and the arm was guaranteed by a drill hole on one piece which aligned perfectly with a corresponding hole on the other".

Ludwig Pollak's story forms the basis of the German novel, Pollaks Arm by Hans Von Trotha (2021, and english translation by Elizabeth Lauffer, 2022,ISBN 978-1-954404-00-7). Pollak's genealogy (including his being a descendant of Rabbi Yehuda Löw (the "MAHARAL" of Prague) and family history forms the basis of a chapter of the non-fiction book "The Wedding Photo" (2018) by Dan A. Oren.

References

External links
The Barracco-Pollak Library (Sovraintendenza ai Beni Culturali Roma site)
Works by and about Pollak in the Deutschen Nationalbibliothek

1868 births
1943 deaths
Classical archaeologists
Czech art dealers
People from Prague
Czech people who died in Auschwitz concentration camp
Czech Jews who died in the Holocaust